Follow That Man (French: Suivez cet homme) is a 1953 French crime film directed by Georges Lampin and starring Bernard Blier, Suzy Prim and René Blancard.

Cast
 Bernard Blier as Commissaire François Basquier  
 Suzy Prim as Mme Olga  
 René Blancard as Dr. Corbier  
 Andrée Clément as Arlette Génod  
 Guy Decomble as Emile Kortenwirth  
 Véronique Deschamps as Yvonne Chouquet - l'employée de Courvoisier  
 Arthur Devère as M. Forgeat  
 Paul Frankeur as M. Mallet 
 Yves Robert as Inspecteur Paulhan  
 Julien Verdier as Guy Couvoisier - le bijoutier  
 Laurence Badie as Georgette, la bonne  
 Madeleine Barbulée as Mme Durbain - la concierge  
 Daniel Cauchy as Pierrot 
 Dominique Davray as Mme Fernande - la couturière  
 Christian Fourcade as Le petit Jacky  
 René Havard as Un inspecteur  
 Albert Michel as Le contrôleur de la prison  
 France Roche as Alice Tissot 
 Michel Salina 
 Paul Villé as Marcel - le beau-frère de François 
 Luc Andrieux as Le régisseur du studio de cinéma 
 René Berthier as Le curé  
 Gérard Buhr as Le jeune au flipper  
 Émile Genevois as Le garagiste  
 Gabriel Gobin as L'agent Faurel  
 François Joux as L'inspecteur Calmain  
 Robert Le Béal as Un inspecteur  
 Robert Mercier as Un agent  
 Émile Riandreys as Le couturier  
 Eugène Stuber as Le bistrot 
 Jean Sylvère as L'inspecteur Martin

References

Bibliography 
 Tim Palmer. Tales of the Underworld: Jean-Pierre Melville and the 1950s French Cinema. University of Wisconsin, 2003.

External links 
 

1953 crime films
French crime films
1953 films
1950s French-language films
Films directed by Georges Lampin
French black-and-white films
1950s French films